Ivoirienne de Transportes Aeriens (ITA) is a cargo airline in Côte d'Ivoire. It was founded in 2007.

Fleet
The Ivoirienne de Transports Aériens fleet consists of the following aircraft (as of August 2017):

See also		
 List of defunct airlines of Côte d'Ivoire

References

External links
Airline history

Airlines established in 2007
Ivorian companies established in 2007
Airlines of Ivory Coast